Sutton Weaver railway station was located in Sutton Weaver, Cheshire, England. The station was opened by the London and North Western Railway on 1 April 1869, closed to passengers on 30 November 1931 and closed on 30 April 1942.

References 

Disused railway stations in Cheshire
Railway stations in Great Britain opened in 1869
Railway stations in Great Britain closed in 1942
Former London and North Western Railway stations